Run Uje Run is a 2020 Swedish comedy-drama film directed by Henrik Schyffert and written by and starring . It won three Guldbagge Awards, including Best Film. The story follows a pop star with Parkinson's disease.

Run Uje Run marks Schyffert's feature film directorial debut. Brandelius' story is autobiographical.

Cast
Uje Brandelius – Uje
Bixi Brandelius 
Vega Brandelius 
Therese Hörnqvist 
Irma Schultz – Radio producer

Release and reception
The film premiered at the 2020 Göteborg Film Festival, where it won the FIPRESCI Prize. Sveriges Television's review praised the film as both sad and humorous, and credited Brandelius with a good screenplay. Dagens Nyheter also positively reviewed the film's sad and humorous tone and called it beautiful.

At the 2021 Guldbagge Awards, the film received honours for Best Film and Best Actor and Best Screenplay for Brandelius. It was also nominated for Best Director for Schyffert; Best Cinematography for Frida Wendel; and Best Editing for Adi Omanovic.

References

External links
 

2020 films
2020 comedy-drama films
Best Film Guldbagge Award winners
Swedish comedy-drama films
2020s Swedish-language films